Never Odd or Even is the debut solo album by The String Cheese Incident keyboard player Kyle Hollingsworth, released in 2004. The album features Dave Watts (of Motet) on drums, Ross Martin on guitar, and Matt Spencer on bass.  It also features guests Joshua Redman, Robert Randolph, and Michael Kang (of String Cheese Incident).

Track listing
 "Prevolution"
 "The Crusade" with Joshua Redman
 "Seventh Step"
 "The Bbridge" with Robert Randolph
 "The Preacher"
 "Gigawatt"
 "The Arc"
 "Ohms"
 "Don't Say"
 "Not Yet"
 "Boo Boo’s pik-a-nik"
 "¡Bam!" with Joshua Redman
 "The Revolution"

Credits
 Kyle Hollingsworth – Keyboards
 Dave Watts - Drums
 Ross Martin - Guitar
 Matt Spencer - Bass

Additional personnel
 Joshua Redman - Saxophone
 Robert Randolph - Pedal Steel Guitar
 Michael Kang - Electric Mandolin

References

2004 albums